The  Post-Journal is a daily newspaper, serving the area around Jamestown, New York. The current editor of the paper is John Whittaker. It is owned by Ogden Newspapers Inc. and is billed as "southwestern New York's leading newspaper" with a circulation of over 10,000 newspapers. The morning newspaper is published six days a week, with the Saturday edition branded as the Weekender; a Sunday edition was launched in the early 1990s but was discontinued in 2019.

Its nearby sister publications include the Warren Times-Observer and the Dunkirk Observer.

On March 13, 2014, the entirety of the newspaper's Web site was placed behind a paywall. The paywall was removed November 1, 2016. The site had previously been behind a paywall for most of the early 2000s but that paywall was also removed.

The Jamestown Journal (weekly) was founded in 1796 by Adolphus B. Fletcher. The Jamestown Journal (daily) was founded by Fletcher in June 1826. In 1941, the Jamestown Evening Journal and Jamestown Post consolidated.

See also
Jamestown, New York
Chautauqua County, New York

References

External links
Official Web site

Daily newspapers published in New York (state)
Jamestown, New York
Newspapers established in 1826
1826 establishments in New York (state)